Just Dance Kids 2014 is a video game for the Wii, Wii U and Kinect for Xbox 360 that is part of Ubisoft's Just Dance franchise. It is a dance-based music game with an emphasis on songs that are popular with children. The game was released on October 22, 2013 in North America, October 24, 2013 in Australia and October 25, 2013 in Europe and contains 31 songs. Music was provided by Boston Soundlabs, with David Ortega serving as executive music producer.

Track listing

References

2013 video games
Just Dance (video game series)
Kinect games
Wii games
Wii U games
Wii U eShop games
Xbox 360 games
Dance video games
Fitness games
Music video games
Ubisoft games
Video games developed in Japan